William Fletcher (born 24 December 1989) is a British rower who competed at the 2016 Summer Olympics.

Education
Fletcher studied at Durham University as a member of Hild Bede, graduating with a Modern Languages degree in 2011.

Rowing career
He competed at the 2013 World Rowing Championships in Chungju, where he won a bronze medal as part of the lightweight coxless four with Adam Freeman-Pask, Jono Clegg and Chris Bartley.

He was part of the British team that topped the medal table at the 2015 World Rowing Championships at Lac d'Aiguebelette in France, where he won a silver medal as part of the lightweight double scull with Richard Chambers.

He and Richard Chambers placed seventh in the men's lightweight double sculls event at the 2016 Summer Olympic Games.

References

1989 births
Living people
British male rowers
Olympic rowers of Great Britain
Rowers at the 2016 Summer Olympics
World Rowing Championships medalists for Great Britain
Alumni of the College of St Hild and St Bede, Durham
Durham University Boat Club rowers